The Path of Our Dream is an Armenian drama. The film premiered in the Armenian theaters on December 19, 2017. The film consists of 7 parts. Each part has its own storyline and director. Some parts of the movie are shot in Turkey and France.
Edgar Baghdasaryan's film titled The Path of Simon won the main prize at the European festival of short films. The Moscow premiere of the film was on 6 February 2018.

Cast
Iveta Mukuchyan as Lilith
Aram Mp3
Sos Janibekyan
Khoren Levonyan
Ani Petrosyan
Babken Chobanyan
Misho
Shant Hovhannisyan
Lilit Varosyan

References

External links

Armenian drama films
2017 drama films
Films shot in Armenia
Films shot in Turkey
Films shot in France
Armenian-language films